The island of Corsica holds two departments, Haute-Corse and Corse-du-Sud. Bodies of water including lakes, reservoirs and lagoons are listed by department:

 List of bodies of water of Haute-Corse
 List of bodies of water of Corse-du-Sud

Corsica
Corsica
Corsica
Bodies of water of Corsica
Bodies of water of Corsica